is a Japanese short track speed skater. He competed at the 1998 Winter Olympics and the 2002 Winter Olympics.

References

External links
Yugo Shinohara at ISU

1978 births
Living people
Japanese male short track speed skaters
Olympic short track speed skaters of Japan
Short track speed skaters at the 1998 Winter Olympics
Short track speed skaters at the 2002 Winter Olympics
Sportspeople from Nagano Prefecture